Forde (Gaeilge: Mac Giollarnáth) is an Irish surname derived from a number of Gaeilge families.

History 
The name is popular throughout the four Provinces of Ireland, especially in County Galway, County Leitrim and County Tipperary.

Mac Giolla Naomh and Mac Giollarnáth 
"Mac Giolla Naomh," meaning "son of the devotee of the saints" was an Irish clann / Sept that originated in southern Connemara, Connacht. Over the years, however, "Mac Giolla Naomh," which was incorrectly transcribed as Mac Giollarnáth, and then erroneously translated as Ford (surname) or Forde, from the resemblance of the final syllable to Áth, a Ford (crossing).

Mac Consnámha 
The name Forde also comes from "Mac Consnámha," or "son of the swimming hound." This Connacht Sept was the name of a family in County Leitrim who were formerly chiefs of Muinter Kenny, in the present, Drumahaire (barony). Often, due to translation the surname was referred to as "Mac an Atha," son of the Ford (crossing), and has therefore been Anglicised as Kinneavy, MacKinnawe or erroneously as Forde.

Ó Fuartháin (Fuaráin) 
Lastly, in County Cork and County Waterford, the name was an Anglicised version of Ó Fuaráin, meaning "descendant of Fuarthán". The personal name Fuartháin, derived from the Gaeilge fuar ("cold"), was once taken to represent the Gaeilge fuarathán ("cold little ford"), which led to the surname being translated as Ford (surname) or Forde although more often it was Anglicised as Foran.
The ancestor of Henry Ford (USA) came from County Cork in 1847.

Forde variants 
Variants of the name Forde include Ford (surname) and Foord and is of Anglo-Saxon descent spreading through the Celtic nations. However, this term originally comes from the Norse fjord meaning a narrow inlet of the sea. More recently Forde and Ford (surname) has often been regarded as a locality name meaning 'river crossing' from a person who lived beside a Ford (river crossing). 

Historical Examples of the surname and its derivatives include Richard de la Forde, of Norfolk, England, who was recorded in the Hundred Rolls in the year 1273 and a Thomas de Furd who was a presbyter in the diocese of Saint Andrews, Scotland, in the year 1406. A Peter ate Ford, was recorded in the Writs of Parliament, in the year 1313 and a Hugh Ford, of Wigan, was recorded in the 'Wills at Chester', in the year 1661. On March 2, 1589, Izabell Forde and Henry Embertonn were married in St. Giles Cripplegate, London, Sir Ambrose Forde was knighted at Leixlip, County Kildare, by Sir George Carey (c. 1541 – 1616), the Lord Deputy, on August 2, 1604. The first recorded spelling of the name is shown to be that of Bruman de la Forda, which was dated 1066, in the Book of Winton, Hampshire (included in the Domesday Book of 1086), during the reign of William the Conqueror, 1066–1087.

Thus, there are also many Irish bearers of this name, who are of English origin as many Fords settled in Ireland with the plantation from England, the most notable of these arriving from Devonshire and were landowners in County Meath.

Forde Coat of Arms

Forde Motto  
Lucrum Christi mihi can be translated as "Without Christ, there is no light".

Forde Family Tartan 

 Name of Tartan: Forde 
 International Tartan Index: 829
 Category: Irish names, Irish clans

Colours of the Forde Family Tartan 
 Slog: GKY:GYK
 Colour Sequence: GKYKRKRKYG

Notable people with the surname Forde include 
Seán Mac Giollarnáth (1880–1970), Irish folklorist
Bernie Forde (born 1957), Irish retired hurler who played as a right corner-forward for the Galway senior team
Brinsley Forde (born 1952), Guyanese actor and musician
Brooke Forde (born 1999), American swimmer

David Forde (soccer) (born 1979), Irish football player
Eugenie Forde (1879–1940), American silent film actress
Evan Forde (born 1952), American oceanographer
Florrie Forde (1876–1940), Australian singer and entertainer
Frank Forde (1890–1983), Australian Prime Minister
Gerhard Forde (1927–2005), American Lutheran Theologian
Jason Forde, Irish hurler who plays for Tipperary senior hurling team
Jewel Forde, Barbadian television presenter
Leneen Forde, Canadian-born solicitor, University chancellor and Governor of Queensland, Australia
Liam Forde (1891–1958), alias of Séamas Ó Maoiléoin (aka James Malone), Irish revolutionary spy

Martin Forde (born 1923), American retired labour union activist
Mattie Forde, Irish Gaelic footballer
Mike Forde (born 1955), NYC District Council of Carpenters Executive Secretary-Treasurer
Nadia Forde, Irish model, singer and actress
Norman Forde (born 1977), Barbadian footballer
Pat Forde (born c. 1965), American sportswriter
Patricia Forde (born 1960), former Director of the Galway Arts Festival and an Irish children's author
Robert Forde (1875–1959), Antarctic explorer and member of the Terra Nova Expedition under Captain Robert Falcon Scott
Samuel Forde (1805–1828), Irish painter
Shaq Forde (born 2004), English footballer
Shawna Forde (born 1967), American anti-illegal immigration activist charged with murder in 2009
Sheri Forde, Canadian sports reporter
Tommy Forde (1931–2012) Northern Irish professional footballer
Victoria Forde (1896–1964), American silent film actress.
Walter Forde (1898–1984), British actor, screenwriter and director.

References